Jambil (Pashto: جامبل) is an administrative unit, known as Village Council in Union Council or Ward Kokarai in Tehsil Babuzai, of Swat District in the Khyber Pakhtunkhwa province of Pakistan.

According to Khyber Pakhtunkhwa Local Government Act 2013. District Swat has 214 Wards, of which total amount of Village Councils is 170, and Neighborhood is 44.

According to Election Commission of Pakistan, Jambil consists of:
 PC Jambil (Mauza Jambil)

Population of Village Council Jambil is 16128, and no of General Seats in Local Bodies Election is 9.

See also 
 Kokarai
 Babuzai
 Swat District

References

External links
 Jambil Valley Archaeological Sites
 Village / Neighbourhood council  
 Khyber-Pakhtunkhwa Government website section on Lower Dir
 United Nations
 Hajjinfo.org Uploads
 PBS paiman.jsi.com 

Swat District
Populated places in Swat District